Ana María Custodio (1908–1976) was a Spanish film actress. She was the daughter of a military man and the sister of the writer Álvaro Custodio. Ana Maria Custodio irregularly continued her career after leaving to mexico.

Selected filmography
 There Were Thirteen (1931)
 The Dancer and the Worker (1936)
 Dawn of America (1951)
 Where Are You Going, Alfonso XII? (1959)
 My Street (1960)
 Three Ladies (1960)
 Alfonso XII and María Cristina (1960)
 The Daughters of Helena (1963)
 A Nearly Decent Girl (1963)
 Honeymoon, Italian Style (1966)
 Good Morning, Little Countess (1967)

References

Bibliography 
 Aubrey Solomon. The Fox Film Corporation, 1915-1935: A History and Filmography. McFarland, 2011.

External links 
 

1908 births
1976 deaths
Spanish film actresses
People from Seville
20th-century Spanish actresses